Igor Yuryevich Abdrazakov (born 7 August 1978) is a former Russian football player.

Club career
He made his Russian Premier League debut for FC Chernomorets Novorossiysk on 5 August 1995 in a game against FC Torpedo Moscow.

External links
 

1978 births
Living people
Bashkir people
People from Novorossiysk
Russian footballers
Association football forwards
FC Chernomorets Novorossiysk players
Russian Premier League players
FC Spartak-UGP Anapa players
FC Rubin Kazan players
PFC CSKA Moscow players
Sportspeople from Krasnodar Krai